Rokopella oligotropha is a species of monoplacophoran, a superficially limpet-like marine mollusc. It is known from only one specimen and a shell fragment collected in the north-central Pacific Ocean.

References

Monoplacophora
Molluscs described in 1972